The 2001 Nobel Prize in Literature was awarded to the Trinidadian-born British writer Vidiadhar Surajprasad Naipaul (1932–2018), commonly known as V. S. Naipaul, "for having united perceptive narrative and incorruptible scrutiny in works that compel us to see the presence of suppressed histories." The Committee added: "Naipaul is a modern philosopher carrying on the tradition that started originally with Lettres persanes and Candide. In a vigilant style, which has been deservedly admired, he transforms rage into precision and allows events to speak with their own inherent irony." The Committee also noted Naipaul's affinity with the novelist Joseph Conrad:

Laureate

In the heart of many V.S. Naipaul's works, colonialism and post-colonial society are the main settings, and the key themes are alienation and identity in a heterogeneous society. When A House for Mr Biswas was released in 1961, it was an enormous hit and Naipaul's big break on the world stage. His other well-known literary prose include A Flag on the Island (1967), The Mimic Men (1967), In a Free State (1971), Guerrillas (1974).

Reactions
The choice of V.S. Naipaul caused mixed reactions. In the Swedish newspaper Svenska Dagbladet professor Sture Linnér praised Naipaul's writing: "He is one of the greatest, not just in our generation but on the whole in modern literature." In the same newspaper, critic Mats Gellerfelt heavily criticised the Swedish Academy's decision to award Naipaul. Gellerfelt argued that Naipaul hade his best time as a writer long behind him, a "postcolonial literature's favourite grandpa", and pointed out three superior candidates for the prize: "In the art of writing novels there are today giants such as Antonio Lobo Antunes, Mario Vargas Llosa and Carlos Fuentes, perhaps the three most prominent novelists alive and still remarkably active and productive, right in the middle of a creativity booming with vigour."

Nobel lecture
V. S. Naipaul delivered his Nobel Lecture entitled Two Worlds at the Swedish Academy in Stockholm on 7 December 2001.

References

External links
2001 Press release nobelprize.org
Award ceremony speech nobelprize.org

2001